Sterna is a genus of terns in the bird family Laridae.  The genus used to encompass most "white" terns indiscriminately, but mtDNA sequence comparisons have recently determined that this arrangement is paraphyletic. It is now restricted to the typical medium-sized white terns occurring near-globally in coastal regions.

Taxonomy
The genus Sterna was introduced in 1758 by the Swedish naturalist Carl Linnaeus in the tenth edition of his Systema Naturae. The type species is the common tern (Sterna hirundo). Sterna is derived from Old English "stearn" which appears in the poem The Seafarer; a similar word was used to refer to terns by the Frisians.

Species
The genus contains 13 species.

For the "brown-backed terns" see genus Onychoprion.

References

External links

 
Bird genera
Taxa named by Carl Linnaeus